Eastern Military Academy (EMA) was a high school military academy founded in 1944 in Connecticut, United States by Roland R. Robinson, a former mathematics teacher at Peekskill Military Academy (now also defunct), and his brother-in-law, Carleton Witham.  The relationship with the local town was poor from the start, and in 1948 the school moved to Cold Spring Hills on Long Island, New York, until the school closed in 1979.

History
At its new location, the school was based in one of the largest mansions ever constructed in the United States, Oheka Castle, built by Otto Kahn, a multimillionaire.  Following Kahn's death in 1934, his heirs had little interest in the estate, and the town of Huntington briefly used it as a retirement home for municipal employees.

EMA was organized for most of its existence as a battalion, with a band company, troop (using horses stabled a few miles away), two infantry companies of high school and junior high school students, a company of children sixth grade and below, a company of day students, i.e. students who did not board in the school, battalion staff of two to four members, and a four-member color guard.  For several years of very high enrollment, the school organized as a regiment.

Robinson and Witham died within six weeks of one another in the summer of 1968, leaving the school in the hands of Alice Robinson, who was Robinson's widow and Witham's sister.  According to an article in Newsday on September 30, 1968, she was then the first woman ever to head a military academy in the USA.  In 1970 she sold the school, without notifying the longtime Dean and new Headmaster, Leopold Hedbavny, or alumni, to three investors.  These investors immediately took out a three million dollar bank mortgage, although they had paid Mrs. Robinson only $50,000 plus stock in their new corporation, and stock in several other of the ultimately nine schools they bought.  All nine schools were eventually closed following the taking out of large mortgages.

In 1955 the Army granted EMA status as an honor Junior ROTC unit.  From 1951 to 1968 students ninth grade and up were taken to a military training base, Camp Smith, for a week in May for riflery training and practice.  This continued at a base in New Jersey until 1975, the same year the school lost its honor rating.  In 1977 the Army struck it from the rolls of recognized Junior ROTC units, and removed all military supplied equipment, mostly M-1 Garand rifles (prior to 1955 cadets used Springfield M1903 rifles).  In 1979, enrollment was down to just ninety from a high of over 350. The school closed in 1979 after a fire had been set in the dormitory floors.

In the late 1960s, as the school was declining, two groups of disgruntled staff broke away and founded the General Douglas MacArthur Military Academy and the Marine Military Academy.

The fire was set in 1976 by a student who was expelled from the school. The fire was set in revenge and could have potentially killed hundreds of people. Fortunately no one was injured. The school took months to repair. Classes were cancelled for days. The culprit was caught and punished. I attended school there at the time it occurred. The fire destroyed letters housed in the main lobby from Presidents Lincoln and Washington. Chris Finnegan-attended 1975-1980

Extra-curricular
The school newspaper was called The Guidon.  The yearbook was The Saber.  The honor society (based on academic grades, military rank, being a class officer, and participation in sports and clubs) was the Order of the Key.  At various points the school had a chess club, camera club, glee club, chorus, ham radio, equestrian, swimming, riflery, fencing, basketball, baseball, varsity and junior varsity football teams.  EMA also hosted one of the first chapters of the Lions Club to be based in a school.

Officers
The battalion commander held the rank of Major.  On dress uniforms this took five stripes, on uniform of the day a diamond shaped pip on the collar.  The battalion adjutant and company commanders were captains (four stripes and three circular pips, the battalion adjutant additionally had four rockers beneath the stripes).  Platoon leaders were generally lieutenants (three stripes, first lieutenant had two circular pips, second lieutenants one).  A sergeant major, always part of the battalion staff, was the highest ranking "noncommissioned" rank, and had two stripes with two rockers and a diamond in the center.  (Officers were addressed by "Sir", and were saluted.)  Each company would generally have a first sergeant, with two stripes and a diamond.  Each platoon would have a sergeant, with two stripes.  Corporals would also have two stripes, but wear them very low on the sleeve instead of high on the shoulder.  Private First Class ("PFC") was awarded to any lowest ranking cadet (privates) who went a full month with fewer than ten demerits, which was also the limit for higher ranking cadets to be advanced in rank.  Rank was lost for excessive demerits, one rank for the first fifteen in a month, and an additional rank for each additional ten demerits.

In parades, officers and the sergeant major carried a saber, first sergeants carried a carbine, two members of the color guard carried the American flag and the school flag, the band had their instruments, the troop their horses, and the infantry companies and older day students carried a rifle.

Uniforms
Uniforms worn by cadets followed the style of the United States Military Academy at West Point. Shoes were black, and loafers were not permitted.  Socks had to be black (medical exceptions allowed).  The "uniform of the day" for all cadets included gray pants with a black stripe on each leg.  The belt was black with a brass buckle that had to be kept polished.  A gray long-sleeved shirt had a shield shaped patch on the right shoulder.  This was the emblem of EMA, an open book atop a vertical saber, hilt down.  The collars had indicia of which company each cadet was attached to, a harp for the band, cross sabers for the troop, and crossed rifles for all others.  Officers had "pips" to indicate rank on the right collar, one circular pip for second lieutenant, two for first lieutenant, and three for captains.  The cadet major had a single diamond shaped pip.
A black tie completed the ensemble.  It did not hang freely, but was tucked into the shirt between the second and third buttons.
On Sundays and for some other occasions cadets wore a "choker" instead of the shirt and tie. This was a gray jacket with a high collar.  Rank was shown by stripes on both shoulders.
For parades and other very formal occasions such as dances and the graduation ceremony cadets wore a jacket known as a 44 for the brass buttons on it.  These had to be kept polished.  The 44 had the usual stripes for rank, plus cadets had any ribbons awarded them, as well as riflery medals.  These medals were the ones used by the United States military for marksman, sharpshooter and expert.

Awards
Cadets who maintained an academic average of 85 or better, with no grades below 80, were eligible for the honor roll.  Good conduct (fewer than 10 demerits in a month), participation in sports or other activities such as the school newspaper or yearbook, library duty, switchboard, various clubs, all earned various ribbons.  The troop tended to have the most, as participation in horseshows drew anywhere from first to sixth place in events with an appropriate ribbon.  Having the highest or second highest grade point average at the conclusion of tenth, eleventh or twelfth grade also got a ribbon, as did highest grades in the various foreign languages (French, German, Latin, and Spanish), history, math, and science.

Discipline
Demerits were accessed on a sliding scale.  Shoes not shined, belt buckle not shined, uncombed hair, and similar offenses drew a single demerit.  Having a messy or dirty dormitory room could draw from one to five demerits, depending on the severity of the offense. Failure to do homework was three demerits.  Direct disobedience to orders, disrespect and similar offense were three demerits to a non-commissioned officer (corporal or sergeant), five to an officer, and ten demerits to a teacher or other staff member.  Off limits was ten demerits.
Demerits had to be marched off, one hour of marching with a rifle for one demerit, and two hours were set aside for this on weekdays (cadets not involved had sports teams, clubs or other activities), or could be worked off.  More than six unresolved demerits meant "military restriction", i.e. the cadet was not eligible for a weekend pass, and had to work off the demerits on the weekend instead.  Matching this was "academic detention", with the same lack of a weekend pass.  It usually indicated either a failing grade in some subject or failure to turn in an assignment.

The elimination of both military restriction and academic detention in 1975 accelerated the school's rapid decline.

Notable
For a few years EMA had an armored unit based on some surplus Armored Personnel Carriers.  Operating these when gasoline prices began rising became prohibitively expensive, and two were given to the New York City police department.  One was allegedly buried on the school grounds.  At the funeral of President John F. Kennedy the riderless horse following Kennedy's caisson bore a saber from EMA which had been presented to the White House by the senior class of 1962 on their class visit to Washington.
EMA's sabers were engraved with a unique, copyrighted design.

Alumni association
An alumni association was formed in 1969, and still exists with its own website. One of the former EMA cadets, Roger Hall, has written about his memories and about Oheka Castle. 
The association's meetings (generally luncheons or dinners) were suspended in April 2020 due to the COVID-19 pandemic, but resumed in May 2021.

In fiction
A very thinly disguised version of Eastern Military Academy, Robinson, and others, appears in the science fiction novel Time for Patriots by Thomas Wm. Hamilton, who graduated EMA in 1956 as valedictorian and sergeant major..

References

Defunct United States military academies
Educational institutions established in 1944
Educational institutions disestablished in 1979
Huntington, New York
Defunct schools in Connecticut
Defunct schools in New York (state)
1944 establishments in Connecticut
1979 disestablishments in New York (state)